Caenis bajaensis is a species of mayfly in the genus Caenis.

References
 NatureServe Explorer October 2015.  Retrieved October 22, 2016.

Mayflies
Insects described in 1983